Robotrix (Chinese 女机械人 pinyin: nǚ jīxièrén "Woman Robot") is a 1991 Hong Kong science fiction exploitation film directed by Jamie Luk Kin-ming and produced by the Golden Harvest Company. Bill Lui, the winner of the 23rd Hong Kong Film Awards (Best Art Direction), is the Art Director of this film. It features Taiwanese-American actor David Wu, Japanese actress , kung fu expert Billy Chow, Hui Hsiao-dan, and the voluptuous soft-porn star Amy Yip. The plot concerns a female police officer who is gunned down, only to have her mind transferred into a cyborg clone. 
The idea of mind uploading as well as some cult elements inside the film make Robotrix become a science fiction film classic in Hong Kong.

This erotic R-rated thriller is notable for a Hong Kong film on general release in featuring frequent female full-frontal nudity, and is particularly notable for a scene of brief full-frontal male nudity (of Hong Kong Chinese actor Chung Lin, playing the robot version of Japanese scientist Ryuichi Yamamoto), as it is perhaps the first time in Hong Kong cinema that a Chinese adult male's private parts have been fully revealed on camera in a film for general release. It was also perhaps notable for leading the way in Hong Kong category 3 martial arts films. Cast member Vincent Lyn said of the film, "Now that was one wild shoot. The cast and crew were all over the place and you were lucky to find out what you were doing before the cameras rolled. I spent more time laughing on the set than anything else."

Plot
A criminally insane scientist, Ryuichi Sakamoto (Chung Lin), transfers his mind into a cyborg and immediately commits a series of rapes and murders. Among his victims is female police officer Selena Lin (Chikako Aoyama). The scientist Dr. Sara (Hui Hsiao-dan) transfers Selena's mind into a cyborg named Eve-27, including Sara's robotic assistant named Ann (Amy Yip), the cyborg-robot team join the police force and pursue the criminal Sakamoto by investigating a series of murdered prostitutes. After Selena/Eve-27 have sexual relations with her policeman boyfriend Chou (David Wu), Ann become curious about human sexual activity, but without human mind Ann is not capable to know further...

Cast
 – Selena Lin/Eve-27
Amy Yip – Ann
David Wu – Chou
Billy Chow – Ryuichi Sakamoto's cyborg
Chung Lin – Ryuichi Sakamoto
Hui Hsiao-dan – Doctor Sara
 – Puppy
Bowie Wu – Police Commissioner
 – Informer Hui

Box office
The film grossed HK$5,486,008 at the Hong Kong box office during its theatrical run from 31 May to 13 June 1991 in Hong Kong.

Blu-ray reprint
This film was first released on Blu-ray Disc on March 27, 2020.

See also
 List of Hong Kong films of 1991
 Nudity in film (East Asian cinema since 1929)

References

External links
 
 
 Robotrix at Hong Kong Cinemagic
 Robotrix in Hong Kong Film Archive

1991 films
1990s science fiction films
1990s Cantonese-language films
Films set in Hong Kong
Hong Kong science fiction films
Martial arts science fiction films
Sexploitation films
Techno-thriller films
Transhumanism in fiction
Transhumanism in film
Android (robot) films
Cyberpunk films
Cyborg films
Films about artificial intelligence
Films about consciousness transfer
1990s Hong Kong films